Kaj-e Mohammad Gavabor (also Romanized as Kāj-e Moḩammad Gavābor; also known as Kaj-e Moḩammad) is a village in Rahimabad Rural District, Rahimabad District, Rudsar County, Gilan Province, Iran. At the 2006 census, its population was 50, in 15 families.

References 

Populated places in Rudsar County